Qiwang was a Go competition in China.

Outline
The tournament was discontinued in 2003.

Past winners and runners-up

References

Go competitions in China